Green Township is one of the thirteen townships of Clinton County, Ohio, United States. The 2010 census reported 2,473 people living in the township, 1,249 of whom lived in the unincorporated portions of the township.

Geography
Located in the southeastern part of the county, it borders the following townships:
Richland Township - north corner
Wayne Township - northeast
Fairfield Township, Highland County - southeast, north of Penn Township
Penn Township, Highland County - southeast, south of Fairfield Township
Union Township, Highland County - south
Clark Township - southwest
Washington Township - west
Union Township - northwest

The entire township lies in the Virginia Military District.

The village of New Vienna is located in the southeastern part of Green Township, along the Highland County line.

Green Township contains the unincorporated community of New Antioch.

Name and history
It is one of sixteen Green Townships statewide.

Formerly part of Highland County, the land was transferred by the Ohio General Assembly so that Clinton County would have the constitutionally mandated  of territory.  The township was created by the Clinton County Commissioners on August 21, 1813.

Government
The township is governed by a three-member board of trustees, who are elected in November of odd-numbered years to a four-year term beginning on the following January 1.  Two are elected in the year after the presidential election and one is elected in the year before it.  There is also an elected township fiscal officer, who serves a four-year term beginning on April 1 of the year after the election, which is held in November of the year before the presidential election.  The trustees and clerk are chosen in non-partisan elections.  Vacancies in the fiscal officership or on the board of trustees are filled by the remaining trustees.

References
Clinton County Historical Society.  Clinton County, Ohio, 1982.  Wilmington, Ohio:  The Society, 1982.
Ohio Atlas & Gazetteer.  6th ed. Yarmouth, Maine:  DeLorme, 2001.  
Ohio. Secretary of State.  The Ohio municipal and township roster, 2002-2003.  Columbus, Ohio:  The Secretary, 2003.

External links
County website

Townships in Clinton County, Ohio
Townships in Ohio